1474 Beira, provisional designation , is a bright carbonaceous asteroid and large Mars-crosser on an eccentric orbit from the asteroid belt, approximately 15 kilometers in diameter. It was discovered on 20 August 1935, by South African astronomer Cyril Jackson at the Union Observatory in Johannesburg. The asteroid was named after the port city of Beira in Mozambique.

Orbit and classification 

Beira is a Mars-crossing asteroid, a dynamically unstable group between the main belt and the near-Earth populations, crossing the orbit of Mars at 1.666 AU. It orbits the Sun at a distance of 1.4–4.1 AU once every 4 years and 6 months (1,650 days). Its orbit has a high eccentricity of 0.49 and an inclination of 27° with respect to the ecliptic. The body's observation arc begins with its official discovery observation at Johannesburg in 1935.

Physical characteristics 

In the SMASS classification, Beira is a bright carbonaceous B-type asteroid, while in the Tholen classification its spectral type is ambiguous, closest to an F-type and somewhat similar to that of an X-type asteroid.

Rotation period 

Three rotational lightcurves of Beira were obtained from photometric observations. Lightcurve analysis gave a well-defined rotation period of 4.184 hours with a brightness amplitude between 0.15 and 0.24 magnitude.

Diameter and albedo 

According to the survey carried out by the NEOWISE mission of NASA's Wide-field Infrared Survey Explorer, Beira measures between 14.9 and 15.46 kilometers in diameter and its surface has a low albedo between 0.06 and 0.07. Conversely, the Collaborative Asteroid Lightcurve Link assumes a standard albedo for stony asteroids of 0.20 and consequently calculates a smaller diameter of 8.73 kilometers using an absolute magnitude of 12.66.

With a diameter close to 15 kilometers, Beira is larger than most sizeable Mars-crossing asteroids such as 1065 Amundsenia (9.75 km), 1139 Atami (9.35 km), 1011 Laodamia (7.39 km), 1727 Mette (est 9 km), 1131 Porzia (7.13 km), 1235 Schorria (est. 9 km), 985 Rosina (8.18 km) 1310 Villigera (15.24 km), and 1468 Zomba (7 km); but still smaller than the largest members of this dynamical group, namely, 132 Aethra, 323 Brucia, 1508 Kemi, 2204 Lyyli and 512 Taurinensis, which are larger than 20 kilometers in diameter (in one or other given source).

Naming 

This minor planet was named after the port city of Beira in Mozambique. The official  was published by the Minor Planet Center in April 1953.

Notes

References

External links 
 Asteroid Lightcurve Database (LCDB), query form (info )
 Dictionary of Minor Planet Names, Google books
 Asteroids and comets rotation curves, CdR – Observatoire de Genève, Raoul Behrend
 Discovery Circumstances: Numbered Minor Planets (1)-(5000) – Minor Planet Center
 
 

001474
Discoveries by Cyril Jackson (astronomer)
Named minor planets
001474
001474
19350820